Don Mingaye (1929–2017) was a British art director. He was employed at Bray Studios working on the set designs for Hammer Films.

Selected filmography
 The Abominable Snowman (1957)
 The Phantom of the Opera (1962)
 The Kiss of the Vampire (1963)
 The Evil of Frankenstein (1964)
 The Brigand of Kandahar (1965)
 Danger Route (1967)
 Salt and Pepper (1968)
Scream and Scream Again (1970)

References

Bibliography
 Ede, Laurie N. British Film Design: A History. I.B.Tauris, 2010.

External links

1929 births
2017 deaths
British art directors
People from Kensington